Secondhand Serenade is an American rock band, led by vocalist, pianist and guitarist John Vesely. Vesely has released four studio albums to date under the name Secondhand Serenade. The name can also refer to John Vesely alone. His debut album used multitrack recording to create the sound of a band using technology, while his second album took a different path, using a proper band and synthesizers to establish a more accomplished sound.

History

Early history, first release (2004–2006)
John Vesely (born February 5, 1982) formed Secondhand Serenade in his home town of Menlo Park in California, USA, in 2004. Vesely was raised in the San Francisco Bay Area in a humorous family and as the son of a jazz musician. He started getting into music at the age of 12.  He spent 8 years playing bass in local bands, featuring in a number of acts ranging in style from ska and hardcore to rock and pop. One of the bands he played in, Sounds Like Life, included fellow Bay Area artist Ronnie Day. After years of playing bass, he opted for an acoustic guitar. Vesely follows in the tradition of John Ondrasik's Five for Fighting. Vesely was also the son of a Czech immigrant. John Vesely found success as Secondhand Serenade.

While some artists may fear the rawness of playing with just an acoustic guitar, John welcomes the honesty it comes along with. He claims "in some ways a band is more powerful, but in other ways there are things you can do with one voice and one acoustic guitar that you couldn't do with an army of musicians behind you."

In 2005, Vesely released his debut album titled Awake. It was recorded as a demo, after booking a few days at a San Francisco studio earlier in 2005, "using just an acoustic guitar and his multi-tracked vocals." The album was promoted through the Secondhand Serenade MySpace page and by playing local shows. The CDs were originally sold through mail order with a PayPal account by Vesely, eventually he signed up with distributor TuneCore, making Secondhand Serenade's songs available on music portals including iTunes.
The album experienced tremendous online support, and by the end of 2006 Secondhand Serenade had received millions of plays on MySpace and had been the social-networking site's No. 1 Independent Artist for months. Financially, he was said to be bringing in up to $20,000 a month from downloads and merchandise sales out of his home. He sold over 15,000 copies of the album on his own, and on the strength of these sales and the support, the labels became interested in him. Secondhand Serenade was signed by longtime label executive Daniel Glass, on his new label Glassnote Records, which is distributed through Warner's Independent Label Group. In 2006, Rolling Stone announced Secondhand Serenade as No. 3 in the magazine's reader's poll for Best MySpace Artist.

Awake re-release (2007) 
In early 2007, Awake was reissued by Glassnote Records with an additional two songs. It was released on January 31 and gave Vesely his first chartings, debuting at number 16 on Billboard's Top Heatseekers chart. Added success led to it peaking at number 164 on the Billboard 200, number 3 on the Top Heatseekers and number 19 on the Independent Albums chart.

In support of his first label release, Vesely was featured on MTV's You Hear It First, AOL Music's Breakers Yahoo! Music's Who's Next? and appeared on talk show Late Night with Conan O'Brien. He also played numerous shows, including tours with Hawthorne Heights and The All-American Rejects and at music festivals South by Southwest and alongside My Chemical Romance and Linkin Park at The Bamboozle.

Secondhand Serenade released only one song as a single from the debut album, "Vulnerable". The song spawned a music video, which was created by Frank Borin, who was responsible for the Red Hot Chili Peppers' video for hit single "Dani California". "Vulnerable" peaked at No. 83 on the Billboard Hot 100, No. 64 on the Pop 100 and No. 56 on the Hot Digital Songs charts.

A Twist in My Story  (2008–2009) 
A Twist in My Story was released on February 19, 2008, and features songs from Awake such as "Maybe" and "Your Call," but reproduced with a full band. The bulk of the album however is a list of new songs written by John Vesely and recorded with a full band. Two tracks on A Twist in My Story were produced by famed producer Butch Walker, while the others were produced by former Nine Inch Nails member Danny Lohner. The first single, "Fall for You," was released January 21, 2008. The album was leaked, and was made available for download one month before its official release. On January 28, 2008, the music video for the first single from the album "Fall for You" premiered on the MTV show TRL. In support of the release, Secondhand Serenade spent most of March and April touring with American bands Making April, Automatic Loveletter, and The White Tie Affair. Members of his touring band include Steve Shebby on bass guitar, Lukas Vesely (Vesely's brother) on keys, Ryan Cook (former bassist of the White Tie Affair) on lead guitar, and Tom Breyfogle on drums.

The title A Twist in My Story is a reference to Vesely's 2008 divorce with his former wife Candice, with whom he has two young sons. Vesely had separated with Candice in August 2007, the time when the tracks for A Twist in My Story were being created.

In November 2008 the album's first single "Fall for You", was certified Platinum by the RIAA.
As of December 5, 2008 "Fall for You" was still No. 13 on the American Top 40 songs in the country.

The "Your Call" video premiered on FNMTV on December 5. It can be viewed on the FNMTV website.

He released a video for the song "Maybe" on his MySpace page on May 4, 2009. It is a video about his concerts and trips around the world and was shot and directed by his tour manager Preston Jones and his drummer Tom Breyfogle.

Deluxe edition of A Twist in My Story was released on February 3, 2009. It contains 5 bonus tracks including radio version of "Your Call", acoustic version of "Fall for You", acoustic version of "Like a Knife", his single "Last Time", and the Coldplay cover "Fix You".

Hear Me Now and Weightless EP (2010–2011) 
Secondhand Serenade's third studio album Hear Me Now, was released on August 3, 2010. In an interview, Vesely stated that the album would be more upbeat than his last album, which focused on relationships.
On June 1, "Something More" was released onto iTunes as a deluxe single with a bonus track "You Are a Drug", a video showing the making of "Something More", and a digital booklet to the new single.

The vocals of Juliet Simms from American rock band Automatic Loveletter were featured on the song "Hear Me Now" and the cover of "Fix You", originally performed by British rock band Coldplay.

On March 3, 2011, Vesely released an EP titled Weightless.

Departure from Glassnote and Undefeated (2012–2015) 
In January 2012 Vesely started a Pledgemusic campaign which he promoted on his Twitter and Facebook in order to fund the recording of his next album. He announced on his Pledgemusic page that he had left his record label to start afresh. He stated that he wanted to focus on the music and not have to deal with "industry politics, expectations, and all of the other unnatural pressures that come along with being tied to companies and corporations", and sarcastically cited creative differences as the reason for leaving his record label in a video, with a caption that read: "LOOL!!!".

Pledges ranged from $10 to $20,000, including various rewards such as signed guitar picks and CDs, handwritten thank you notes and lyric sheets, private Skype guitar lesson and Q&A sessions, VIP passes to a concert, the opportunity to visit Disneyland or Universal Studios with him, a signed and used Gibson guitar, a co-writing session with him in LA, a dinner for two home-cooked by him in LA, a private concert, and so on. Pledgers would also be entitled to exclusive videos, streams of demos and new songs, pictures, blog posts, and much more. It was also announced 25% of the money raised would go to Ear Candy, a charity that provides musical instruments and education to children.

During the summer of 2012, Vesely recorded an acoustic remake of A Twist in My Story. In July 2012, the release date and the title of the remake were announced by Vesely and it should be released on iTunes and Amazon as download. One week before the official release some sample of "Suppose", "Stranger", "Like a Knife", and his new recorded song "Belong To" were released on SoundCloud site.

On September 11, 2012, Vesely released the acoustic remake of his older album A Twist in My Story called A Naked Twist in My Story. After this release Vesely goes back to the studio to record his new album with producer/engineer Brandon Metcalf in Nashville, TN.

On February 26, 2013, the single "Shake It Off" was released to start promoting the new album. Vesely explained the concept of "Shake It Off" in a 2013 interview with Musichel, ""Shake It Off" is a song about putting everyday problems behind you and staying positive. I really thought it was time for me to write a feel good song and I couldn't be happier with how it turned out."

On a videochat on Spreecast, Vesely announced the official title of the new album: Undefeated.

On April 22, 2014, Secondhand Serenade released his OneRepublic "Counting Stars" cover, published on the covers album The Cover Up by Brandon Metcalf's Destiny Nashville.

The Rebel Roads (2015) 
On April 24, 2015, John proposed to Veronica Ballestrini on stage at his show in Las Vegas, NV. The couple met at Destiny Records in Nashville to do three acoustic duets for his album Undefeated, "Heart Stops (By the Way)", "La La Love" and "Nothing Left To Say" back in February 2013. Ballestrini later went on tour with him starting on March 8 in Lexington, Kentucky and ended on April 10 in West Hollywood, California. They developed a relationship on March 22, 2013. John married his second wife Veronica on April 1, 2017, in Vero Beach, Florida. 
The duo started a collaboration act as The Rebel Roads and released their single "First to Know" on iTunes on December 2, 2016.

In 2015, Secondhand Serenade appeared on Blues Traveler's album Blow Up the Moon, co writing the song "Hearts Are Still Awake" and singing the song "The Darkness We All Need".

Awake: Remixed & Remastered, 10 Years & 10,000 Tears Later (2017) 
On February 10, 2017, Secondhand Serenade released Awake: Remixed & Remastered, 10 Years & 10,000 Tears Later. Produced and distributed by Glassnote Records, a compilation including two new songs: "Don't Look Down"' and "Lost". Vocals are all Vesley and in an interview on YouTube, Vesley states on how much he appreciates his fans and support since he's grown from MySpace.

Discography

Studio albums

Extended play

Demo, compilation and other album

Singles

References

External links
Official Site
Official Facebook
Official Myspace
Interview with Secondhand Serenade at TheMusicEdge.com, 3/3/06
"Secondhand Serenade; Digital Distribution Provides Boost To Heatseeking Artist," Billboard, 2/23/07
"Secondhand Serenade confirms "2007 Couch Tour" with Monty Are I," Monsters and Critics, 3/22/07
"Secondhand Serenade brings raw emotion first-hand," Daily 49er, 3/28/07
"Secondhand Serenade Named 'MTV Discover & Download Artist'; Band Now featured on Yahoo! 'Who's Next?' and AOL 'Breakers' Online Competitions," top-40 charts, 3/29/07
[ Complete Secondhand Serenade Discography]

Emo musical groups from California
Rock music groups from California
Menlo Park, California
American pop rock music groups
Glassnote Records artists
Musical groups established in 2004